Nemanja Janičić (born 13 July 1986) is a Bosnian professional footballer who plays as a centre-back for Regional League of the Republika Srpska - West club Naprijed Banja Luka.

Club career
Born in Banja Luka, SFR Yugoslavia, present day Bosnia and Herzegovina Janičić started playing as a senior with Mogren in the 2004–05 Second League of Serbia and Montenegro season. He played with Mogren a total of 7 seasons, until 2011, having played the last five already with Mogren competing in the separate Montenegrin First League. 

After winning the Montenegrin championship for the second time, in the summer of 2011, Janičić moved to Serbia and joined First League side Bežanija, but after only 6 months, during the 2011–12 winter break, he moved to Napredak Kruševac. In the 2012–13 Serbian First League season, Napredak finished top, and thus won promotion to the Serbian SuperLiga.

After Napredak, Janičić played for Lokomotiv Tashkent in Uzbekistan from 2015 to 2017 where he won the Uzbekistan Super League once, the Uzbekistan Cup once and the Uzbekistan Super Cup once. He left Lokomotiv Tashkent for Borac Čačak and then he played for hometown club Borac Banja Luka and Luftëtari.

In January 2019, Janičić came back to Borac. In the 2018–19 First league of RS season, with Borac, he won the league title and got promoted back to the Bosnian Premier League. He fell out with coach Vlado Jagodić in September 2020 and was suspended by the club for two matches.

Honours
Mogren
Montenegrin First League: 2008–09, 2010–11
Montenegrin Cup: 2008

Napredak Kruševac
Serbian First League: 2012–13

Lokomotiv Tashkent
Uzbekistan Super League: 2016
Uzbekistan Cup: 2016
Uzbekistan Super Cup: 2015

Borac Banja Luka
First League of RS: 2018–19

References

External links

1986 births
Living people
Sportspeople from Banja Luka
Serbs of Bosnia and Herzegovina
Association football central defenders
Bosnia and Herzegovina footballers
FK Mogren players
FK Bežanija players
FK Napredak Kruševac players
PFC Lokomotiv Tashkent players
FK Borac Čačak players
Luftëtari Gjirokastër players
FK Borac Banja Luka players
Second League of Serbia and Montenegro players
Montenegrin First League players
Serbian SuperLiga players
Serbian First League players
Uzbekistan Super League players
Premier League of Bosnia and Herzegovina players
Kategoria Superiore players
First League of the Republika Srpska players
Bosnia and Herzegovina expatriate footballers
Expatriate footballers in Serbia
Bosnia and Herzegovina expatriate sportspeople in Serbia
Expatriate footballers in Uzbekistan
Bosnia and Herzegovina expatriate sportspeople in Uzbekistan
Expatriate footballers in Albania
Bosnia and Herzegovina expatriate sportspeople in Albania